C. J. Graham is an American actor who became known for playing Jason Voorhees in the sixth installment of the Friday the 13th film series, Friday the 13th Part VI: Jason Lives.

Career
A 6'3" former nightclub owner, he was spotted as a potential Jason Voorhees for Friday the 13th Part VI: Jason Lives when he was playing Jason in a night club act, impressing the casting people who were in search of a new Jason since the current Jason actor Dan Bradley was not coming across as imposing or powerful as they had hoped for. He played Jason in all scenes and stunts except for the Paintball scene which they had already filmed with Bradley. And the opening graveyard scene which was played by Christopher Swift. Graham reprised this role in the video for Alice Cooper's "He's Back (The Man Behind the Mask)", which was written for and featured in the film which blends footage from the film with some new footage.

As of 2017, Graham has only played one other role – he appeared in the horror film Highway to Hell as the main antagonist, a heavily made-up, silent monster called the Hell Cop. As of 2010, Graham is the VP of casino operations at Thunder Valley Casino in Lincoln, California. This is similar to Heather Langenkamp (of A Nightmare on Elm Street fame) and Richard Brooker (of Friday the 13th Part III fame), who are both full-time business owners and part-time actors. He has been known to speak highly of his time as Jason, even claiming that he would reprise the role in another film if asked.

Graham is currently the COO of the Ague Caliente Spa Resort and Casino in Rancho Mirage, California.

According to an online interview with Kane Hodder, the actor who played Jason directly after Graham had, Graham actually had a chance to reprise the role of Jason years later in 2003 when the long-awaited film Freddy vs. Jason went into production and the producers of that film were searching for a new actor to play Jason; having decided to exclude Hodder after the four movies he had done as the iconic hockey-mask killer with supposed reasons ranging from his height compared to Robert Englund, the actor who portrayed Freddy Krueger in that film, to the producers simply wanting to try something different with Jason. Graham's agent wanted him to audition for the role again but Graham, both being a good friend of Hodder and feeling like the New Line producers were treating him unfairly with the re-casting decision, wanted no part in it. Ultimately, the role went to Canadian stuntman Ken Kirzinger. Graham commonly visits horror conventions and loves to meet his fans and sign autographs.

Filmography
 Friday the 13th Part VI: Jason Lives (1986) as Jason Voorhees (All scenes except the "Paintball Scene")
 He's Back (The Man Behind the Mask) (1986) as Jason Voorhees (Archive footage from "Jason Lives" and some new footage)
 Highway to Hell (1992) as Sergeant Bedlam, Hellcop
 13 Fanboy (2021) as himself

References

External links
 The Home of CJ Graham (official site)
 

American male film actors
Living people
Year of birth missing (living people)
Place of birth missing (living people)